Fertility is an unincorporated community located along Strasburg Pike, in East Lampeter Township in Lancaster County, Pennsylvania, United States.

References

Unincorporated communities in Lancaster County, Pennsylvania
Unincorporated communities in Pennsylvania